Myles Pollard (born 4 November 1972) is an Australian actor. He is known for his role as Dr. James Edmunds in Home and Away and previously Nick Ryan on the TV series McLeod's Daughters.

Early life
Myles Pollard was born in Perth, and grew up in remote communities in Western Australia, where his father was a school principal and his mother taught music. Although they moved every two to five years, Pollard spent the latter part of his high-school years in Perth. He graduated from university with a Bachelor of Arts in Education (English and Drama) in 1994.

Career
After university, Pollard moved to Sydney to begin an acting career. He performed King Lear at the New Theatre and auditioned for NIDA the following year. He was accepted into their three-year program, graduating in 1998.

His break out role was on McLeod's Daughters (2001-2006), where received a Silver Logie Award nomination for Most Popular Actor at the 2003 Australian TV Week Logie Awards. In 2005, he announced that he was leaving the show to pursue other opportunities in the USA.  His character, Nick Ryan was supposedly killed in a plane crash. But after several episodes he returned having been in a coma and not on the flight after all. Yet he and Tess departed two episodes later, in order for him to take a new job in Argentina, never to be seen on the show again.  

Pollard has also had roles on the television shows Wildside, Invincible, Water Rats, Home and Away, All Saints, and Double Trouble. After his first job, on Wildside, he toured with Bell Shakespeare in a version of Romeo and Juliet that explored themes of racism in Australia.

Personal life
Pollard played water polo for two years in 1989/90 and 1990/91 with Triton Water Polo Club in Perth, Western Australia. He married Brigitta Wuthe in 2006. Their son, Ronin Wilson Pollard, was born in 2007. He lives in the Western Australian town of Dunsborough, he now has a part-time job as an English relief teacher at various schools within the South-West of western Australia, most notably he has worked at both Busselton Senior High School and Cape Naturaliste College as a relief teacher, and has gained a certain infamous teaching style and attitude from students at both schools.

Filmography

References

External links

 ABC At The Movies Thirst reviewed 21 March 2012

1972 births
Australian male stage actors
Australian male television actors
Living people
Male actors from Perth, Western Australia